Hameyran or Hamiran or Homeyran may refer to:
 Hameyran, Bandar Lengeh
 Homeyran, Parsian